Kinikinik is a small unincorporated community in western Larimer County, Colorado in the United States. It is located along State Highway 14 in the upper Poudre Canyon west of Fort Collins on the east side of Cameron Pass. The community consists of a general store and neighboring summer mountain resorts and vacation homes. The  activities include fishing in the Cache la Poudre River and hiking in the nearby mountains in the Roosevelt National Forest.  The community was named for the kinnikinick plant by early settlers.

Kinikinik is also famous for being one of the longest Palindromic Places in the US, and in the world.

Unincorporated communities in Larimer County, Colorado
Unincorporated communities in Colorado